Wilbur Joseph Cohen (June 10, 1913 – May 17, 1987) was an American social scientist and civil servant.  He was one of the key architects in the creation and expansion of the American welfare state and was involved in the creation of both the New Deal and Great Society programs.

Early life and career
Cohen was born in Milwaukee, Wisconsin, to Bessie (née Rubenstein) and Aaron Cohen. He was known to by several nicknames. He was once dubbed "The Man Who Built Medicare" and John F. Kennedy tagged him "Mr. Social Security", although it was Frances Perkins, the first woman Secretary of Labor (under FDR), who was the architect of social security. The New York Times called him "one of the country's foremost technicians in public welfare."  Time portrayed him as a man of "boundless energy, infectious enthusiasm, and a drive for action."  He was a leading expert on Social Security and a member of Americans for Democratic Action.

After graduating from the University of Wisconsin–Madison in 1934, Cohen moved to Washington, D.C. where he was a research assistant for the committee which drafted the Social Security Act.

On April 8, 1938, Cohen married Eloise Bittel. They had three sons: Christopher, Bruce and Stuart.

He was Director of the Bureau of Research and Statistics in charge of program development and legislative coordination with Congress for the Social Security Board (SSB), which was renamed the Social Security Administration in 1946.

Kennedy and Johnson administrations
In 1961, President John F. Kennedy appointed Cohen as Assistant Secretary for Legislation of Health, Education, and Welfare.  According to Christy Ford Chapin (Insuring America's Health:  The Public Creation of the Corporate Health Care System p. 205) it was Cohen who, during the writing of Medicare legislation, "advised fellow reformers that partnering with insurance companies would create a politically palatable program"—with the result that America is today the only "developed" country with a for-private-profit health care system and without universal health care.

Nicholas Lemann (The Promised Land:  The Great Black Migration and How It Changed America p. 131 & 143) describes Cohen as "a first-generation New Deal social welfare planner [who] was deputy secretary but the real power in the Department of Health, Education and Welfare" and "an old friend of [Lyndon] Johnson."  President Lyndon B. Johnson elevated him to Under Secretary in 1965, and he served as the U.S. Secretary of Health, Education, and Welfare from May 1968 to the end of Johnson's term, following the resignation of John W. Gardner. With a tenure of 249 days, Cohen became the shortest-ever secretary of that department, as the office was succeeded by the U.S. Secretary of Health and Human Services in 1980. Cohen also served a shorter tenure than any Secretary of Health and Human Services did, until 2017, when Tom Price, the first Secretary of Health and Human Services of the Trump administration, resigned after just 231 days, setting a new record for the shortest tenure.

Later life and death
In 1969, Cohen retired at the end of a Johnson's administration. In 1970, Cohen served as the president of the American Public Welfare Association (renamed the American Public Human Services Association in 1997). In 1971, Cohen was elected to the Common Cause National Governing Board. In 1980 Cohen became a Professor of Public Affairs at the University of Texas at Austin.

The University of Michigan in Ann Arbor, where Cohen was a professor of Public Welfare Administration and lived for many years, established the Wilbur J. Cohen Collegiate Professor of Social Work professorship in his honor.

He died while attending a gerontology conference in Seoul, South Korea, on May 17, 1987.  He is interred at Garden of the Memories Cemetery in Kerrville, Texas.

Books
 The Elimination of Poverty in the United States.  Wilbur J. Cohen, 1963.
 The Roosevelt New Deal: A Program Assessment Fifty Years After.  Wilbur J. Cohen. Austin, Texas: University of Texas Press. 1986 paperback edition: , .
 Social Security: Universal or Selective? Wilbur J. Cohen and Milton Friedman, co-authors. Washington: American Enterprise Institute for Public Policy Research. 1972. 
 Unemployment Insurance in the United States: The First Half Century.  Saul J. Blaustein, Wilbur J. Cohen, William Haber, co-authors. Kalamazoo, Michigan: W. E. Upjohn Institute for Employment Research.  1993 hardcover edition: , .

Biography
 Wilbur J. Cohen: the pursuit of power; a bureaucratic biography. Marjorie O'Connell Shearon. Shearon Legislative Service. 1967.
 Mr. Social Security: The Life of Wilbur J. Cohen.  Edward D. Berkowitz. Lawrence, Kansas: University Press of Kansas.  1995 hardcover edition: , .

References

 Social Security Administration profile
 Guide To Social Security Archives, Papers of Wilbur Cohen
 Kansas Press book on him
 Site on LBJ's cabinet
 Literacy Connections list of publications by Wilbur J. Cohen

External links

 

1913 births
1987 deaths
American political writers
American male non-fiction writers
American social sciences writers
American social scientists
Jewish American social scientists
Jewish American members of the Cabinet of the United States
Social security in the United States
Scientists from Milwaukee
University of Wisconsin–Madison alumni
University of Michigan faculty
United States Secretaries of Health, Education, and Welfare
University of Texas at Austin faculty
Kennedy administration personnel
Lyndon B. Johnson administration cabinet members
20th-century American politicians
20th-century American non-fiction writers
20th-century American male writers
Members of the National Academy of Medicine